Parapancha is a 2016 Indian Kannada-language psychological comedy film directed & written by Krish Joshi and produced by Yogaraj Movies in association with Vedam Studios. The film stars Diganth and Ragini Dwivedi in the lead roles besides Anant Nag, Bhavana Rao and H. G. Dattatreya in other pivotal roles. The music is composed by Veer Samarth.

Actor Yogesh has featured in a special song sequence.

Cast
 Diganth 
 Ragini Dwivedi
 Ashok
 Anant Nag
 Rangayana Raghu
 Yogaraj Bhat as Kaalipeeli
 Bhavana Rao
 Anitha Bhat
 K. S. L. Swamy
 H. G. Dattatreya
 V. Manohar
 Sagar S
 Vikas
 Yogesh in a special appearance

Soundtrack

The soundtrack and film score was composed by Veer Samarth. Lyrics for the soundtrack was penned by Yogaraj Bhat and Jayant Kaikini. Anand Audio distributed the album into the market. Actors Anant Nag and Rangayana Raghu recorded a song each for the soundtrack. The soundtrack album consists of eight tracks. The album was released on 11 July 2015 in Bangalore. In December 2015, director and actor Huccha Venkat recorded the track "Huttida Ooranu" for the film.

Track listing

References

External links
 

2016 films
2010s Kannada-language films
Indian comedy films
2016 drama films